The 1922 Arkansas Razorbacks football team represented the University of Arkansas in the Southwest Conference (SWC) during the 1922 college football season. In their first year under head coach Francis Schmidt, the Razorbacks compiled a 4–5 record (1–3 against SWC opponents), finished in sixth place in the SWC, and outscored their opponents by a combined total of 143 to 136.

Schedule

References

Arkansas
Arkansas Razorbacks football seasons
Arkansas Razorbacks football